Robert Mulick (born October 23, 1979) is a Canadian former professional ice hockey defenceman.

Career
Prior to his pro career he played four seasons of junior hockey for the Sault Ste. Marie Greyhounds of the Ontario Hockey League and served as team captain his final season. He was drafted by the San Jose Sharks in the 1998 NHL Entry Draft and played five seasons in the American Hockey League, spending two seasons with the Kentucky Thoroughblades and three seasons with the Cleveland Barons.

After becoming a free agent, Mulick went on to play five seasons in Italy's Serie A. He spent one season with HC Bolzano and four seasons with SG Cortina. He won a Serie A championship in 2007 with SG Cortina.

Career statistics

External links

1979 births
Bolzano HC players
Canadian ice hockey defencemen
Cleveland Barons (2001–2006) players
SG Cortina players
Kentucky Thoroughblades players
Living people
San Jose Sharks draft picks
Sault Ste. Marie Greyhounds players
Ice hockey people from Toronto